+ h.c. is an abbreviation for “plus the Hermitian conjugate”; it means is that there are additional terms which are the Hermitian conjugates of all of the preceding terms, and is a convenient shorthand to omit half the terms actually present.

Context and use
The notation convention “+ h.c.” is common in physics in the context of writing out formulas for Lagrangians and Hamiltonians, which conventionally are both required to be Hermitian operators.

The expression

means

The mathematics of quantum mechanics is based on complex numbers, whereas almost all observations (measurements) are only real numbers. Adding its own conjugate to an operator guarantees that the combination is Hermitian, which in turn guarantees that the combined operator's eigenvalues will be real numbers, suitable for predicting values of observations / measurements.

Dagger and asterisk notation

The dagger is an old notation in mathematics, but is still widespread in quantum-mechanics.

References

Hamiltonian mechanics
Quantum mechanics
Lagrangian mechanics
Abbreviations
Operator theory